Jacqueline Gail "Jackie" Huggins  (born 19 August 1956) is an Aboriginal Australian author, historian, academic and advocate for the rights of Indigenous Australians. She is a Bidjara/Pitjara, Birri Gubba and Juru woman from Queensland.

 she is co-chair of the Eminent Panel advising the Queensland Government on the process truth-telling and future treaties with Indigenous peoples.

Early life and education
Jacqueline Gail Huggins was born in Ayr, Queensland, on 19 August 1956, the daughter of Jack and Rita Huggins. She is of the Bidjara / Pitjara (Central Queensland) and Biri / Birri Gubba Juru (North Queensland) peoples. Her family moved to Inala in Brisbane when she was young and she attended Inala State High School. She left school at age 15 to assist her family and worked as a typist with the Australian Broadcasting Commission at Toowong, Queensland, from 1972 to 1978. Thereafter she joined the Commonwealth Department of Aboriginal Affairs in Canberra. In 1980 she returned to Brisbane and was a field officer in the Department of Aboriginal Affairs.

Huggins' son was born in 1985. Huggins enrolled at the University of Queensland in 1985, graduating with a BA (Hons) in history and anthropology in 1987. She earned a Diploma of Education (Aboriginal Education) in 1988. Part of her practical training included eight weeks teaching in Ti-Tree, north of Alice Springs. Huggins completed an honours degree in history/women's studies (1989) from Flinders University in Adelaide, South Australia.

Career
Huggins was co-chair of Reconciliation Australia (with Fred Chaney and Mark Leibler), the chair of the Queensland Domestic Violence Council, co-commissioner for Queensland for the National Inquiry into the Separation of Aboriginal and Torres Strait Islander Children from Their Families (1995–1997) and a member of the Council for Aboriginal Reconciliation, the AIATSIS Council, National NAIDOC Committee (1979–1983), and the Review of the Aboriginal and Torres Strait Islander Commission (ATSIC) in 2003. She has also served on many other boards and organisations in various capacities.

She has published a wide range of essays and studies dealing with Indigenous history and identity. She is the author of Sistergirl (1998), and co-author, with her mother Rita, of the critically acclaimed biography Auntie Rita (1994).

Huggins was a member of the working party involved in the creation of the First Nations Australia Writers Network (FNAWN) in 2012, and  remains patron of the organisation.

Huggins was deputy director of the Aboriginal and Torres Strait Islander Unit at the University of Queensland until 2017, and then co-chaired the National Congress of Australia's First Peoples with Rod Little until 2019.

In 2019, after the Queensland Government announced its interest in pursuing a pathway to an Indigenous treaty process, the Treaty Working Group and Eminent Treaty Process Panel were set up, with Huggins and Michael Lavarch co-chairing the Eminent Panel. Their Path to Treaty Report was tabled in Queensland Parliament in February 2020. Huggins said that a process of truth-telling, acknowledging the history of Australia, is a "vital component to moving on". On 13 August 2020, the government announced that it would be supporting the recommendation to move forward on a path to treaty with First Nations Queenslanders.
Huggins, with her sister Ngaire Jarro, wrote the story of their father, Jack, who spent three years as a Japanese prisoner of war during World War II, and was forced to work along with around 13,000 others on the Burma-Thailand railway. The book, entitled Jack of Hearts: QX11594, was published in 2022. Jack was not treated badly upon his return, as many Aboriginal diggers were, and became the first Aboriginal man to work for Australia Post, the first Aboriginal surf lifesaver in Ayr in the 1930s, and the only Indigenous man to play rugby league both before and after the war.

Recognition

1996: Auntie Rita won the 1996 Stanner Award for Indigenous Literature from AIATSIS.
2000: Queensland Premier's Millennium Award for Excellence in Indigenous Affairs
2001: Member of the Order of Australia (AM) for her work with Indigenous people, particularly in reconciliation, literacy, women's issues and social justice.
2001: Centenary Medal for distinguished service to the community through the promotion of reconciliation
2006: Doctor of the University of Queensland honoris causa
2007: Fellow the Australian Academy of Humanities
 2007: University of Queensland Alumnus of the Year
 2022: John Oxley Library Award

Selected works

As co-author
  (Reissued in 2020.)

References

Further reading

 – Links to 4 articles by Huggins, 2003–2004.

1956 births
Australian biographers
Australian historians
Australian women historians
Bidjara (Warrego River)
Flinders University alumni
Indigenous Australian writers
Living people
Members of the Order of Australia
Recipients of the Centenary Medal
University of Queensland alumni
Academic staff of the University of Queensland
Writers from Queensland
Women biographers
Australian feminist writers
Indigenous Australian feminists
Fellows of the Australian Academy of the Humanities